Stretton and Claymills railway station is a disused railway station in Stretton, near Burton upon Trent, Staffordshire.

History 

The station was opened by the North Staffordshire Railway in 1901.

The line itself dated back to 1848, and from 1878, was shared by the Great Northern Railway with its GNR Derbyshire and Staffordshire Extension. Although the correct name is "Clay Mills", both companies referred to it as one word.

The station was built of timber throughout. There was a small booking office, and general and ladies’ waiting rooms on the main platform, with an open-fronted shelter on the other. Access was by inclined ramps from the road way outside. The LMS rebuilt the platforms in concrete, halving them to 150 foot.

The station closed in 1949 but remained intact until it was demolished in 1964. The preceding station, Horninglow, also closed in 1949 but continued to be used by occasional excursion trains, but it is not known if this was the case with Stretton. Goods traffic continued to use the line until 1966.

Present day 

The track has since been removed, and the way hard-surfaced to make the 'Jinnie Trail'. The station master's house has been a private dwelling since the line closed.

References

Further reading

Disused railway stations in Staffordshire
Railway stations in Great Britain opened in 1848
Railway stations in Great Britain closed in 1949
Former North Staffordshire Railway stations
Former Great Northern Railway stations